Shacha sauce (also spelled sa cha sauce) is a savory, slightly spicy Chinese condiment used in Teochew, Fujian, and Taiwanese cuisines. It is made from soybean oil, garlic, shallots, chilies, Chinese brill, and dried shrimp. It is also sometimes sold as "Chinese barbeque sauce".

Shacha sauce is used many different ways; as a soup base, a barbeque meat rub, a dipping sauce (for hot pot), or a seasoning for stir-fries. It is also included with instant noodles manufactured in Vietnam, in their own packet alongside packets of soup base, dried vegetables, or other seasonings.

Origin 
Shacha sauce is also known as sa-te in the Teochew and Hokkien dialects, reflecting its origin in the satay sauce introduced by expatriate Min Nan people returning to China from Southeast Asia. During the 20th century, Chinese labourers from the Chaoshan region who worked in Southeast Asian countries (e.g., modern-day Malaysia and Indonesia) adapted satay sauce to local tastes, including the introduction of dried seafood. Shacha is now quite different from the peanut-based satay sauce popular in Malaysia and Indonesia. Following the Chinese Civil War, Chaoshan immigrants resettled in Taiwan and introduced shacha sauce to the Taiwanese culinary repertoire. One in particular, Liu Lai-chin, a Tainan-based noodle shop owner originally from Chaoshan, created the iconic Bullhead brand (牛頭牌) of shacha sauce in 1958. In the 1960s and 1970s, as beef consumption slowly gained cultural acceptance in Taiwan, shacha sauce became more popular among locals.

See also

 List of Chinese sauces
Siu haau sauce
Peanut sauce
XO sauce
Shito - Similar condiment used in Ghana

References

Chinese condiments
Fujian cuisine
Teochew cuisine
Taiwanese cuisine
Chinese sauces
Barbecue sauces